Lipomyces is a genus of fungi in the family Dipodascaceae.

References

Saccharomycetes